Eugen Doga (born 1 March 1937) is a Soviet composer. 

A creator of three ballets "Luceafărul", "Venancia", "Queen Margot", the opera "Dialogues of Love", more than 100 instrumental and choral works – symphonies, 6 quartets, "Requiem", church music, and other, plus music for 13 plays, radio shows, more than 200 movies, more than 260 songs and romances, more than 70 waltzes; he is also the author of works for children, the music for the opening and closing ceremonies of the Olympic Games in 1980 in Moscow.

In Moldova, the years 2007 and 2017 (when the composer celebrated his 70th and 80th birthdays, respectively) were declared the Year of Eugen Doga. Chișinău's main pedestrianised thoroughfare has been named Eugen Doga Street in his honour.

The World Intellectual Property Organization (Geneva) in recognition of his outstanding achievements in music awarded him with a special certificate in 2007.

Biography

Youth and education

Doga was born on 1 March 1937 in the village of Mocra in the Rîbniţa District (then in Moldavian Autonomous Soviet Socialist Republic), in a Romanian family.

The childhood of the composer coincided with a period of historical cataclysms – the war, repressions, hunger, poverty, exhausting hard work (the composer's memories of his childhood).
 
After finishing seven years at school, Eugen Doga with his friends went to Chișinău (barefoot and without money, as he recalled later) to enroll in the School of Music of which he learned about when listening to a homemade radio. He was admitted to the music school, despite having no prior training. Thanks to his natural talent and hard work, Eugen Doga managed to quickly catch up, mastered musical notation and learned to play cello. He still has the fondest memories of his cello teacher Pablo Giovanni Baccini, who with his personal example greatly influenced the future destiny of the composer.

"My second teacher, an old man by the name of Pavel Ivanovich Bachinin, became my salvation. I always think of him with joy. He scheduled my first lesson at 6 o'clock in the morning. I came in – he was already sitting there playing the piano. I liked him a lot – intelligent, very musical, and tactful. He worked with me every morning from 6:00 to 8:30, before lectures, for two and a half years. He taught me not only to play the cello, but simply to be a decent human being. He never said the word 'must', never used the imperative mood. However, through his own example, his attitude, he had taught me a lot,"- says Eugen Doga.

In 1951–1955 he studied at the Music School in Chișinău, specializing in cello, and then at the Conservatory where one of his classmates was a future opera star Maria Bieșu. She made her debut with his song "White flower garden" (Floare de dalbă liadă) on the Moldovan television. Paralysis of the left hand prevented a career of a musician – this was due to the fact that he used to live in a basement. Doga studied for another 5 years at the Art Institute "Gavriil Musicescu", in the class of Professor S. Lobel specializing in composition. 1 January 1957 for the first time in his work, "New Year song" (Cântec de anul nou) was performed on the Moldovan radio children's choir and orchestra under the baton Shiko Aranova. In 1963, he wrote his first string quartet.

After graduating from the Conservatory in Chişinău, he performed as cellist in the Orchestra of the State Committee of the Moldavian Soviet Socialist Republic for television and radio (1957–1962), taught at the Music College "Stefan Neaga" from Chişinău (1962–1967), and worked from 1967 to 1972 at the repertory-editorial Board of the Ministry of Culture of Moldova.

He made his compositional debut in 1963, with a string quartet, later becoming the author of many musical compositions, theater scores and film soundtracks.

Concert activity

Since 1972 with his concerts he has traveled all over the territory of the former Soviet Union, also some foreign countries.

"The image of the person is defined by his deeds that ultimately benefit people and society. And the concerts that I give in Chișinău, Moscow, St. Petersburg, Kursk or Bucharest, are aimed at precisely this idea of bringing people together, preserving the ideals that make people kinder, more tolerant, that make flowers bloom, and the sun shine brighter,"- says Eugen Doga.

Eugen Doga's concerts took place in the biggest concert halls. They "gathered huge audiences", and they still do so today. "...There were so many offenses because of Eugen Doga's concerts; people just did not want to talk to me. They told me: "I have been asking you for three years, and you can't arrange Eugen Doga's concert." And I really couldn't, because he was very busy. In Leningrad there was a concert orchestra conducted by Anatoly Badhen, a wonderful orchestra, unequaled in the Soviet Union, which played high-quality music. This orchestra for many years gave a lot of concerts with Eugen Doga's music everywhere, throughout the Soviet Union" – Mikhail Murzak. Philharmonic Director of Chișinău (1972–1988 years).

His music was performed by the Choir of TV and radio Moldova, the Russian state Symphony orchestra of cinematography, Academic Choir "Doina", The George Enescu Philharmonic Orchestra, the Moscow chamber orchestra "The seasons", Leningrad Concert Orchestra, Academic Grand choir "Masters of choral singing", Orchestra of the Moldavian Philharmonic "Sergei Lonkevich", Moscow city Symphony orchestra "Russian Philharmonic", The national Symphony orchestra of the public company "Teleradio-Moldova", the Presidential orchestra of the Republic of Moldova, Children's choir "Liya Ciocarlia", Large children's choir of the USSR Gosteleradio, Orchestra of the Romanian National Opera Iasi and other groups.

Public activities

Equally important for Eugen Doga during his whole life was his public work. In 1987–1991 he was a member of the Committee on Lenin and State Prizes of the USSR. For two convocations he was in the Supreme Soviet of Moldavia, for two more – in the Supreme Soviet of the USSR. As of 2001 he is the permanent chairman of the jury of the All-Russian Movement "Gifted Children of Russia", chairman of the jury of the contest of family Theatre. From 1997 to 2002 he has worked with preschool children in a house where he lives. Member of the International Academy of the Arts, Member of the Academy of film art "NIKA", Full member of the Russian Academy of science and culture; Member of the International Academy of Arts and culture. Throughout the creative activities of Eugen Doga conducts awareness-raising concerts, charity concerts, lectures to students.

He is constantly in numerous juries of various music and cinematic competitions and festivals across Russia and abroad: Festival "Spirit of fire", Kremlin Cadet ball, Berdyanskiy International Film Festival, Education International Festival in Iasi (Festivalului Internaţional al Educaţiei), International Film Forum "Gold Knight", The all-Russian children's charity ball books heroes" and so on.

Doga declared that he supports Unification of Romania and Moldova.

He is an Orthdox Christian, belonging to the Metropolis of Bessarabia.

Family

"Family is the home port, which any ship is seeking for, wherever it is. Even despite long distances. Our, artists', distances are incommensurable, but I am glad to have my wife, daughter and grandson waiting for me". Eugen Doga

In 1962 Eugen Doga was married to a graduate of the Moscow technological Institute of Natalia. They have a daughter, Viorica (television director) and grandson, Dominic (student).

 Father – Dmitry Fedorovich Doga (1906).
 Mother – Elizabeth Nikiforovna Doga (1915).
 Wife – Natalia Pavlovna Doga (1939), engineer.
 Daughter – Viorica Doga (1966).
 Grandson – Dominique Doga

Today

Currently Eugen Doga lives with his family in Chișinău, as well as in Moscow. He continues to perform live, still participates in various festivals.

In 2012, the anniversary concert in the Great Hall of the Moscow Conservatory, Concert Hall Ateneul Roman in Bucharest, at the National Palace in Chișinău, in 2013 – in Kazakhstan, 2014 – performances in Tomsk, Stavropol, in Iasi, in the park Arts Titan in Bucharest and others. In 2014, his waltz "Gramophone" was performed in the hall Ateneum Roman at the annual awarding of the Romanian Academy for outstanding achievements in the field of culture, science and education, along with works by Mozart, Enescu, Strauss and Borodin.

He continues to social activities – spent with like-minded charity concerts at Children's Hospital and the hospital, in Tiraspol, participates in festivals.

Two Waltzes Eugen Doga are in the top 200 best classical works of all time.

In 2012 Eugen Doga established the International Fund "Dominanta". The Fund is designed to facilitate the implementation of the composer's creative and spiritual principles – cooperation in the field of musical art, cinema.

On January 18, 2014 the salon "Eugen Doga" opened its doors. This is the implementation of long – standing ambition to create a Music room, which will bring together like-minded people. The main aim of the Salon is the convergence of the society in a fragmented world today with the help of art and communication.

The documentary film "Eugen Doga" took the big prize at the International Festival of Independent Film "HERCULES.ro"in Romania.

Creation

Film music

In 1967, Eugen Doga began writing music for cinema and it became a regular engagement for many years. "The first movie with my music came out in 1968, the last – in 2011. Cinema is a whole separate life, my most important and favorite genre. In cinema music I was able to express all of my stylistic aspirations; I got to work with great orchestras, musicians, and movie directors from around the world" – says Eugen Doga.

Eugen Doga's debut as a movie composer was in 1967 in the movie directed by George Voda "We need a gatekeeper for anime" based on the fairytale "Ivan Turbinca" by Ion Creanga – a fantastic story about amazing adventures of a soldier from the royal army, who was invited to serve as a guard of the gates to paradise.

He continues to write music for movies. Not a single composer before Eugen Doga has worked so intensively and fruitfully in this studio. From 1960s to 1970s he wrote music for almost half of the movies produced by the studio "Moldova-Film." There was a running joke in the studio that it should be renamed into "MolDoga Film".

Film music. Emil Loteanu

In 1970 , Eugen Doga began his creative collaboration with director Emil Loteanu, starting with the movie "Lautarii" (1973, 13, 8 million viewers)) about folk musicians of Moldova, whose music he used to listen to as a child. Eugen Doga grew up in a region where, according to him, there were "great folk traditions," where his maternal ancestors lived (the composer kept the book of the genealogic tree of his mother's family going back 300 years). Based on that folklore, he wrote the music for the movie which created a furor and brought the authors a Silver shell at the International Film Festival in San Sebastian.

After that a tight creative collaboration between the composer and the famous Moldovan director. In the end of 1971 on the poem by Gh. Vodă Doga wrote the song "My white city", which became a musical symbol of the capital of the republic, and which is performed hourly by the chimes at the turret of the City Hall of Chișinău. A future pop star Sofia Rotaru debuted with this song, and the song became one of the most popular around the whole of the former Soviet Union.

In 1976, already at Mosfilm, Eugen Doga together with Loteanu created the movie "Queen of the Gypsies"(1976, Soviet leader rolled in 1976, 65 million viewers, copies have been sold in 120 countries.) – a romantic legend about a dramatic love of two young and proud gypsies. This picture won the Grand Prix – the "Golden shell" at the International Film Festival in San Sebastian. In order to create the music for this movie, Eugen Doga studied gypsy folklore around the whole of the Soviet Union. In 1978, for a film adaptation of the novel by Anton Chekhov "Drama at the hunt," Loteanu again engaged Eugen Doga. The movie is called A Hunting Accident (1978, 26 million. viewers) A famous waltz from the movie became wildly popular; it has become a cult, many newlyweds use it for their first dance and you can often hear it on the radio and TV.

"I felt that popularity as well: I will never forget a huge line at the music store on the Garden Ring Road, where they were selling music records with soundtrack to the movie A Hunting Accident, recalls the composer. This waltz is now performed around the world. It was performed during the mass gymnastic composition (2000 athletes) at the opening of the Olympic Games in 1980; it was also used in the scene of the first ball of Natasha Postova at the opening ceremony of the 2014 Olympic Games in Sochi. Ronald Reagan called it "the waltz of the century" when he visited Moscow. Today this tune is performed every day not only in sounds not only in Marriage Registrations Hall, but also on subway, and on the streets; it is often by choreographers for staging of ballet and dance routines, and by athletes. This waltz is considered the most well-known movie waltz.

Victoria Demici, a British-Romanian writer, is the author of the lyrics versions of the famous Waltz 'My Sweet and Tender Beast'. She wrote both the Romanian (2012) and the English (2022) lyrics for Doga's masterpiece. Paula Seling and Catalina Caraus are singing the poetry versions of the Waltz.

Canadian ice-skater, Madeline Schizas, performed to the lyrics version of the Waltz during the 2022 Olympic Games in Beijing and made it to the third place.

American ice-skater, Isabeau Levito, skated to the poetry version written by Eugen Doga and Victoria Demici during the 2023 U.S. Figure Skating Championships. The 15-year-old ice-skater won the Gold Medal accompanied by the so-called Waltz of the Champions.

Film music. Continued

"To his music in the Soviet cinema people kept silent, cried, got married, went to heaven" – the NTV channel

Eugen Doga found success not only in films by Loteanu. In 1982, at the International Film Festival in Giffoni (Italy) it won the first prize in the category of animated films. In the 1980s, 1990s, and 2000s Eugen Doga continued to write a lot of music for cinema. Music in movies not only enhances the emotional coloring of the action, but it continues to live for years after the movie is released, and is performed in concerts as well.

Dozens of movies shot in Moscow, St. Petersburg, Kiev and other cities will have in their credits the name of Eugen Doga. In Palermo and in San Sebastian, in Bucharest and in Moscow jury always together with the talent of directors recognized the contribution by the composer – "rare, poetic music, and its full integration with the storyline." For the music written for movies the composer has been awarded a number of prizes and awards.

He composed music for many films, including Soviet productions Maria, Mirabela (1981) and My Sweet and Tender Beast (1978), which is known under its international title A Hunting Accident.

In 1983, Eugen Doga wrote the music for the famous movie by Loteanu "Anna Pavlova" about the legendary ballerina Anna Pavlova. 

Doga's waltz from the film My Sweet and Tender Beast was used twice in the Olympic Games opening ceremonies: in the 1980 Summer Olympics in Moscow and in the 2014 Winter Olympic Games in Sochi where it was performed in the famous scene in Tolstoy's War and Peace of Natasha's first formal Ball in St. Petersburg. In the latter case, the waltz was performed in an unauthorized arrangement. The composer expressed his outrage in his Facebook post where he wrote: " I lost my face with this "arrangement" ".

The other Doga's celebrated waltz is Gramophone (Граммофон), composed in 1992, for the nonsuccessful Belarusian crime film Without Evidence (Без улик).

Academic music

Throughout his creative career Eugen Doga wrote music in academic genres. These were large scale forms, romance songs and so on. 
His creative talent is characterized by free use of different genres and styles. Eugen Doga believes that a professional composer must be able to write in any genre of music. The main thing in music Eugen Doga considers the melody.

He has written a symphony (1969), ballets "Luceafarul" (1983) and "Venancia" (1989), the opera "Dialogues of Love" (2014), six string quartets, cantatas "White Rainbow" (verses E.Loteanu), "Spring of mankind" (verses A. Strimbeanu), "The Human Voice" (lyrics by R. Rozhdestvensky), "The Heart of the Century" (verses I. Podilians), several cantatas with soloists, chorus and Symphony Orchestra, including the cantata for children's performance ("Lia-ciocarlia", "Bună dimineaţa" (Good morning), "Vine-vine primăvara" (goes, comes spring), two requiem (1969 – without a word, 1994 at the poems by Pushkin), two symphonic overtures, requiem, 10 choirs and capella verses E. Beech two choruses and capella verses M. Eminescu, 70 waltzes, as well as many pieces for violin, cello, flute, accordion, piano.

In the first round of creative interests include M. Eminescu, V. Micle, G. Vieru. Of Russian classics: Poets of the Silver Age, the names V. Bryusov, K. Balmont, Marina Tsvetaeva, A. Koltsov, S. Yesenin, Vl. Lazarev, A.Dementiev and others.

Ballets

In the early 1970s, Eugen Doga began writing a ballet based on the poem Luceafărul – the greatest work by the classic of Romanian literature Mihai Eminescu. However, he was only able to continue after a long period of time.

"Only ten years later Luceafărul relented and graced my music sheets, creating a world that drew me in so strongly, drew me in so much that I felt like in a short period of time I had lived a whole eternity," – said the composer. In 1983 the ballet was written in 2 and a half months – 500 pages of a complicated musical score. The ballet "Lucheaferul" premiered on June 6, 1983 at the National Theatre of Opera and Ballet and it was performed on that stage for several years. In 1984 for the ballet "Lucheaferul" Eugen Doga was awarded the State Prize of the USSR. The ballet was also performed in Moscow at the Bolshoi Theater, at the Kremlin Palace of Congresses, and was filmed by the Leningrad TV. Several performances took place in St. Petersburg, Minsk, Kiev and Odessa. It was staged for the second time in 2007 at the National Opera and Ballet Theatre of Moldova. It was also presented to the public in the open air in front of the Central cathedral in the park in Chișinău in 2009. The music from the ballet was often performed in various concerts – in Ateneu Roman in 2007, in 2012 in Bucharest, in the Tchaikovsky Hall in Moscow in 2012.

This ballet has become one of the pinnacles of the composer's creative career.
 
A fantastic storyline of a fairy tale by Eminescu was first expressed in the language of music. A dream of love, a collapse of romantic illusions, cosmic infinity of the stellar world and earthly reality are all outlined with completed musical images in continuous symphonic development using the combination of traditional techniques of Western European and Russian theater classics and national character of musical images.
 
"For example, where did the musical images in my ballet come from? They come from somewhere in the Carpathians and even further out,"- says Eugen Doga.

And images of his next ballet "Venancia" came from the other hemisphere. Eugen Doga visited Nicaragua, Argentina, Honduras, Brazil where he studied unique folklore of Latin American countries and collected material for a ballet. The music of these countries combines the origins of the European music with the ancient folklore of the Indians. It presents an incredible diversity of styles, sophisticated rhythms and melodies. 
Due to the collapse of the Soviet Union, the ballet was not staged. The storyline of the ballet – romance, love, fight for freedom. The premiere of a concert version of the ballet took place in 2007 in Chișinău (Moldova) performed by the orchestra, chorus and soloists of the Moldavian Philharmonic. In 2008, the music to the ballet was performed in Bucharest, and in 2012 – in the Great Hall of the Moscow Conservatoire.

Currently, he is working on another ballet, "Queen Margot", but it is not finished yet.

Opera "Dialogues of Love"

In 1972 Eugen Doga for the first time wrote two works for chorus on the poems by a genius of Romanian literature Mihai Eminescu.

In the creative work of Eugen Doga, the poetry by Mihai Eminescu and his lover, poet Veronica Micle occupied a very important place. In 1983 he created ballet based on a fantastic story of the poem by Mihai Eminescu.

In 1996 the composer was presented with a collection of poems "Dor nemângâiat" by Veronica Micle. Eugen Doga wrote more than 40 romance songs on poems of Mihai Eminescu and Veronica Micle. Since he got so inspired by the dramatic love story of these two poets, he wrote an opera about it (first aria written for the opera "Do not cry" Nu plînge. Liric by Veronica Micle).

Music for stage plays and radio plays

Eugen Doga wrote music also for animated films, for a series of films from multi-episode TV show for the Central TV channel This Fantastical World. The work was based on materials of Russian and Western science fiction writers. The characters participated in adventures to distant planets, and the composer was supposed to create music that would transport the viewers to those imaginary distant worlds.

Songs were used for the verses R. Bradbury, N. Hikmet, А. Tolstoy, M. Voloshin. Leading gear was pilot-cosmonaut Georgy Grechko.

Prizes and awards

Member of the Union of Composers of Moldova (1961) and the USSR (1974).
Member of the Union of Cinematographers of the USSR (1975).
Honored Artist of the Moldavian SSR (1974).
Laureate of the State Prize of the Moldavian SSR (1980).
People's Artist of Moldova (1984).
Laureate of the USSR State Prize for the music for the "Luceafărul" ballet and music for motion pictures (1984).
People's Artist of the USSR (1987).
Member of Academy of Sciences of Moldova (1992)
Officer of the Order of the Republic (Moldova) – 1997.
Officer of the Order of the Star of Romania (2000).
Recipient of the gold medal "Person-2000" (USA).
Recipient of the jubilee medal and a diploma in honor of the 150th birth anniversary of Mihai Eminescu "For prominent contribution to the propaganda of the poet's creative work" (2000).
Recipient of the "Ovation" prize (2001), "Ovation" (2007).
He was awarded the Order of the Star of Romania – Commander's grade (2004).
Beanie Master International festival of arts "Master Class" (2004).
He was awarded the Order "For Services to the Fatherland", IV grade (January 10, 2008) – for prominent contribution to the development of music and many years of creative work.
He was awarded the Order of the Republic of Moldova (2007).
Recipient of the "Danaker" Order, the Republic of Kyrgyzstan (2007).
Award "Commonwealth" (2007).
Award "Beacons Of The Motherland" (2007).
The order of the Ruby cross "Sacred power" (2007).
He is an honorary citizen of Chișinău. 
A music school was named after him "Eugen Doga". 
In Moldova, the year 2007 (when the composer celebrated his 70th birthday) was declared the Year of Eugen Doga.
Chișinău's main pedestrianised thoroughfare has been named Eugen Doga Street in his honour.
The World Intellectual Property Organization (Geneva) in recognition of his outstanding achievements in music awarded him with a special certificate.
Laureate of the State Prize of the Republic of Moldova – 2008.
Order "For the good of the Fatherland", Russia, 2008.
Eugen Doga was awarded the "Order of Faithful Service" of Romania, 2014.
The minor planet 10504 Doga (1987 UF5), discovered by Lyudmila Zhuravlyova was named after Eugen Doga.
The "Golden Knight" prize for the music for "Ash Waltz" motion picture (2011)
The year 2017, when the composer celebrated his 80th anniversary, was declared the Year of Eugen Doga in Moldova.

Books and movies about Eugen Doga

Books
"Eugen Doga" – Efim Weaver. Chișinău, 1980 (on the mold. askalice)
"In the constellation of talent" Efim Weaver. (about the composer; ibid., 1979, No. 4)
"The world of sounds Eugen Doga" Efim Weaver. (Aurora, RAF, 1979, No. 15)
"In the mirror moments". Elena Shatokhina. Publishing house "Timpul" (1989 Gros.) 
Eugen Doga: Compozitor, academician /Acad. de Şt. a Moldovei ; coord. : GheorgheDuca. – Ch. : Î.E.P. "Ştiinţa". – (Col."Academica”).Vol. 3. – 2007.
"Eugen doga – familiar and unknown." E. Kleinich. Isdataat. Composer, 1999. – 227 C. Are photos from the family archive of E. Doga.
"Do În major / Eugen Doga"; Larisa Turea, ABC Centrală. graf.: V. Cutureanu, D. Mazepa. – Ch.: [s.n.], 2007. – 63 p.
"Non-musical fields or Vortex spiral of time". This book contains autobiographical notes, his essays, interviews, correspondence with fans, friends, neighbors and relatives. Publisher: Favorite Russia, 2008
"Meditaţie pe portativ", Victor Crăciun, Eugen Doga, Ducureşti. 
"Eugen DOGA: Muzica este prima şi ultima mea iubire" Luminiţa Dumbrăveanu, (editura Prut International, 296 pagini, Chişinău). 7 mai 2013.(Romanian) "Eugen Doga: Music is my first and last love". 
 
Movies
Eugen Doga. Emil Loteanu, 1983 (Russian)
Poets Of Europe. Yuri Vondrak, 2000. (Russian)
St. Petersburg vacation. 2007. (Russian)
 Eterna. Teleradio Moldova. 2007. (Romanian)
 White city. ITRC "Mir", 2010. (Russian)
The score of my life. Viorica Doga. 2012. (Romanian)
Filmul "Eugen Doga". Serialul de filme documentare / enciclopedice "100 romani celebri nascuti in Moldova". Studioul "Flacăra Film", Luminiţa Dumbrăveanumai, 2013. (Romanian, English subtitles)

References

External links

 Official website of Eugen Doga
 
 Website "Let me introduce – Eugen Doga" 
 "Eugen Doga – Bibliografie" 
Academy of Sciences of Moldova, Eugen Doga

1937 births
20th-century Russian male musicians
Living people
People from Rîbnița District
Academicians of the Russian Academy of Cinema Arts and Sciences "Nika"
Communist Party of the Soviet Union members
Academic staff of High Courses for Scriptwriters and Film Directors
Titular members of the Academy of Sciences of Moldova
Commanders of the Order of the Star of Romania
People's Artists of Moldova
People's Artists of the USSR
Recipients of the National Order of Faithful Service
Recipients of the Order "For Merit to the Fatherland", 4th class
Recipients of the Order of Alexander Nevsky
Recipients of the Order of the Republic (Moldova)
Recipients of the USSR State Prize
Male film score composers
Moldovan composers
Moldovan conductors (music)
Moldovan musicians
Moldovan opera composers
Romanian composers
Romanian film score composers
Romanian musicians
Russian film score composers
Russian male composers
Russian music educators
Russian opera composers
Soviet film score composers
Soviet male composers
Soviet music educators
Soviet opera composers
Romanian people of Moldovan descent
Members of the Romanian Orthodox Church
Moldovan expatriates in Russia
Russian people of Moldovan descent
Russian people of Romanian descent